The Teahouse of the August Moon is a 1956 American comedy film directed by Daniel Mann and starring Marlon Brando. It satirizes the U.S. occupation and Americanization of the island of Okinawa following the end of World War II in 1945.

John Patrick adapted the screenplay from his own Pulitzer-Prize- and Tony Award-winning Broadway play of 1953. The play was, in turn, adapted from a 1951 novel by Vern J. Sneider. The film was entered into the 7th Berlin International Film Festival. The supporting cast features Glenn Ford, Machiko Kyō, Eddie Albert, Paul Ford and Harry Morgan.

Plot

Misfit Captain Fisby (Glenn Ford) is sent to Americanize the village of Tobiki on Okinawa, the largest of the Ryukyu Islands. His commanding officer, Colonel Wainwright Purdy III (Paul Ford), assigns him a wily local, Sakini (Marlon Brando), as interpreter.

Fisby tries to implement the military's plans by encouraging the villagers to build a school in the shape of a pentagon, but they want to build a teahouse instead. Fisby gradually becomes assimilated to the local customs and mores with the help of Sakini and Lotus Blossom, a young geisha (Machiko Kyō).

To revive the economy, he has the Okinawans manufacture small items to sell as souvenirs, but nobody wants to buy them. These include cricket cages and wooden Japanese footwear called geta. Then Fisby makes a happy discovery. The villagers distill a potent sweet potato brandy in a matter of days which finds a ready market in the American army. With the influx of money, the teahouse is built in next to no time.

When Purdy sends psychiatrist Captain McLean (Eddie Albert) to check up on Fisby, the newcomer is quickly won over. This, even after Fisby greets McLean wearing geta, an army bathrobe (which Fisby claims is his kimono) and what Fisby terms an "air-conditioned" straw hat (the latter being headwear worn by Okinawan farmers). McLean later proves to be enthusiastic about organic farming.

When Purdy doesn't hear from either officer, he shows up in person and surprises Fisby and McLean, the latter wearing a yukata (summer-weight kimono). They are leading a rowdy song at a party in full swing in the teahouse. Purdy orders the building and distillery destroyed. In a burst of foresight, the villagers break up old water urns rather than the brandy storage and only dismantle the teahouse, hiding the sections.

The village is chosen by the Supreme Commander of the Allied Powers (SCAP) as an example of successful American-led democratization. This leads to Colonel Purdy's regretting his actions and to reassembling the teahouse.

Cast
 Marlon Brando as Sakini
 Glenn Ford as Captain Fisby
 Machiko Kyō as Lotus Blossom
 Eddie Albert as Captain McLean
 Paul Ford as Colonel Wainwright Purdy III
 Jun Negami as Mr. Seiko
 Nijiko Kiyokawa as Miss Higa Jiga
 Mitsuko Sawamura as Little Girl
 Henry (Harry) Morgan as Sergeant Gregovich

Production
Playing the role of an Okinawan villager was to prove an interesting challenge for Marlon Brando's method acting techniques. He spent two months studying local culture, speech, and gestures and, for the actual shooting, spent two hours daily having make-up applied to make him appear Asian.

The role of Colonel Wainwright Purdy III was to have been played by Louis Calhern, but he died of a sudden heart attack in Nara early in production and was replaced by Paul Ford. Ford had played the part more than a thousand times on Broadway, having been an original cast member, and he would play a similarly bumbling, harassed colonel  in Phil Silvers' TV series Bilko.

Ford was not the only actor who went on to be cast in a television series role very similar to his Teahouse character. Like the psychiatrist Captain McLean, Eddie Albert's "Oliver Wendell Douglas" on Green Acres (1965-1971) was a licensed professional with an advanced degree, who obsessed about the glory of farming and yearned to give up his practice in favor of tending the soil.

The film made use of Japanese music recorded in Kyoto and sung and danced by Japanese artists. Machiko Kyō (Lotus Blossom) had won acclaim for her dramatic performances in Rashomon and Gate of Hell, so this lightly comedic part was a departure for her.

Home Media 
In November 7, 2006, was released in DVD by Warner Bros. Home Entertainment as part of The Marlon Brando Collection along with Julius Caesar, Mutiny on the Bounty and Reflections in a Golden Eye. In November 20, 2018, was released in DVD, under the label Warner Archive Collection.

Reception
The picture was well received, both at the box-office and critically. The film was MGM's biggest hit of the year, earning $5,550,000 in the US and Canada, and an additional $3,375,000 from a worldwide audience. The film made a profit of $1,507,000. It was nominated for a Golden Globe Award for Motion Picture Promoting International Understanding.

Legacy
Alongside Japanese War Bride (1952) and another Brando film Sayonara (1957), The Teahouse of the August Moon was argued by some scholars to have increased racial tolerance in the United States by openly discussing interracial marriages. Other scholars have argued that the movie is one in a long list stereotyping Asian American women as "lotus blossom, geisha girl, china doll, or Suzie Wong" by presenting Asian women as "passive, sexually compliant and easy to seduce" or as downright prostitutes. The movie has been criticized by critical theorists and Brando's performance branded as an example of yellowface casting.

A 1971 musical version of the play, Lovely Ladies, Kind Gentlemen ran only two weeks on Broadway, closing after 19 performances.

In 1980, Michael Medved awarded Marlon Brando's performance a Golden Turkey Award for "Most Ludicrous Racial Impersonation".

See also
 The Teahouse of the August Moon (novel)
 List of American films of 1956

Further reading

 Hiroshi Kitamura. 2019. "Runaway Orientalism: MGM’s Teahouse and U.S.-Japanese Relations in the 1950s." Diplomatic History

References

External links

 
 
 
 
 
 
 

1956 films
1956 comedy films
CinemaScope films
American comedy films
American satirical films
Films about geisha
Films based on American novels
American films based on plays
Films directed by Daniel Mann
Films set in 1945
Films set in Okinawa Prefecture
Films shot in Japan
Japan in non-Japanese culture
Metro-Goldwyn-Mayer films
Occupied Japan
Okinawa under United States occupation
Films based on adaptations
1950s English-language films
1950s American films